Sisana (सिसाना) is a village of Sonipat district, Haryana, India. This village comes under the Tehsil of Kharkhoda. The vehicle RTO falls under the same; the vehicle numbers start from HR79 and HR10 for private vehicles. This is the largest village inhabited by Dahiya khap (दहिया खाप) currently, and is most important of all. Major decisions of the Dahiya community are taken in this village stage named Dahiya Khap ka Chabutra (दहिया खाप का चबूतरा) which is an important place. 

The village was first inhabited in 1221. The nearest villages are Khanda, Bakheta,Farmana,Gorad, Humayupur, Kharkhauda, Matindu, and Silana. It is mainly inhabited by Dahiya Jats. Sisana is now divided into two parts (panchayat): Sisana1 and Sisana2. 
Most of the population in the village is Hindu. The village is surrounded by many temples, including Shivalya Mandir, Khatu Shyam Mandir, Narayan Ashram, and Dhikkan wala mandir. 

The village is surrounded by ponds and fields. A Shiv Mandir is in the centre of the village, which also has a park and a pond nearby. A major source of water is a canal which is locally called Bidro/Badro.

Notable residents
Baje Bhagat - artist
Colonel Hoshiar Singh Dahiya - Param Vir Chakra awardee

References 

Villages in Sonipat district